Animocarb (Matacil) is an organic chemical compound with the molecular formula C11H16N2O2. It has a colorless or white crystal-like appearance and is most commonly used as an insecticide.

History 
Aminocarb has been extensively used in eastern Canada since 1976 in order to control the spruce budworm. The fate of this chemical in the ecosystem and detection of aminocarb was studied by the use of two-dimensional thin-layer chromatography. The use of thin-layer chromatography helped isolate and identify the methyl amino, amino and hydroxymethyl analogues from the in vitro metabolism of aminocarb by liver homogenates from humans and rats.

Production and uses 
Aminocarb is a carbamate insecticide widely used to protect cotton fields, crop fields, and forests from insect infestation. It helps in the control of aphids, soil mollusks, lepidopterous larvae, and other types of chewing insects. It is most commonly administered as an aerosol spray.

Reactions 
Aminocarb can be degraded through irradiation and hydrolysis.

Irradiation 
Aminocarb can be broken down by short-wave ultraviolet radiation. Irradiation is often carried out by a high pressure xenon-mercury lamp. Irradiating aminocarb in ethyl alcohol and cyclohexene solutions initially causes the oxidation of the dimethylamine moiety. The process eventually leads to the formation of a 4-dimethylamino-3-methyl phenol product.

Hydrolysis 
Aminocarb undergoes hydrolysis to 4-dimethylamino-3-methylphenol in 25 °C purified water when pH of the water is 6.4. 4-dimethylamino-3-methylphenol is then either directly or via 2-methyl-1,4-dihydorquinone converted to 2-methyl-1,4-benzoquinone. If methylamine or diethylamine are present in the solution 2-methyl-1,4-benzoquinone will readily react. Monoepoxides and diepoxides of 2-methyl-1,4-benzoquinone are formed.

Biomedical effects
In an experiment where young brown bullhead were exposed to aminocarb at lethal and sublethal concentrations, their tissue distribution was examined and showed that the concentration of residues in each tissue increased with the concentration of exposure of aminocarb. The liver and stomach/intestine had the highest amount of accumulation of residues.

Aminocarb is also known as a cholinesterase inhibitor that has nervous system effects causing convulsions and respiratory failure. It can also be absorbed through the skin, causing long-term effects to the nervous system and liver.

References

Acetylcholinesterase inhibitors
Carbamate insecticides
Anilines
Aromatic carbamates
Phenol esters
Dimethylamino compounds